Samuel Ball Platner (December 4, 1863 – August 20, 1921) was an American classicist and  archaeologist.

Platner was born at Unionville, Connecticut, and educated at Yale College. He taught at Western Reserve University and is best known as the author of various topographical works on ancient Rome, chief among them A Topographical Dictionary of Ancient Rome, completed after Platner's death by Thomas Ashby and published in 1929; and as a contributor to the 1911 Britannica.

Bibliography
 The topography and monuments of ancient Rome (1st ed. 1904; 2nd rev ed. 1911; Boston, Allyn & Bacon).

References

External links
 

American archaeologists
American classical scholars
1863 births
1921 deaths
Yale College alumni